Hubert Józef Banisz (16 February 1928 – 19 March 1983) was a Polish footballer who competed in the 1952 Summer Olympics.

References

1928 births
1983 deaths
Association football defenders
Polish footballers
Olympic footballers of Poland
Footballers at the 1952 Summer Olympics
Poland international footballers
People from Piekary Śląskie
Sportspeople from Silesian Voivodeship
Szombierki Bytom players